Andrei Alexandru Cordoș (born 6 June 1988) is a Romanian footballer who plays defender.

Club career
Cordoș started to play football at CRD Cluj youth team. He moved to Universitatea Cluj and in 2006 he made his debut for the first team. He became one of the best defenders of Universitatea Cluj. The Romanian club had offers for Andrei Cordoș from Lazio and Steaua București but the club officials refused to sell him. In 2007 Cordoș helped Universitatea Cluj to promote to Liga I.

In summer 2019, Cordoș became a member of Lithuanian Žalgiris. After 2019 season he left Žalgiris. In 2019 A lyga he played 10 matches and scored one goal.

National team
Cordoș played three times for the Romania national under-19 football team scoring one goal and four times for the Romania national under-21 football team.

Honours

Club
Maziya
Maldivian FA Charity Shield: 2017

References

External links
 

1988 births
Living people
People from Câmpia Turzii
Romanian footballers
Association football defenders
Liga II players
FC Universitatea Cluj players
CS Luceafărul Oradea players
Liga I players
ASA 2013 Târgu Mureș players
FC Vaslui players
FC Dinamo București players
CS Pandurii Târgu Jiu players
FC Botoșani players
Serie C players
Frosinone Calcio players
A Lyga players
FK Žalgiris players
Romanian expatriate footballers
Expatriate footballers in Italy
Romanian expatriate sportspeople in Italy
Expatriate footballers in the Maldives
Romanian expatriate sportspeople in the Maldives
Expatriate footballers in Lithuania
Romanian expatriate sportspeople in Lithuania